The 2013–14 season was the 134th season of competitive football in England.

Promotion and relegation

Preseason

Postseason

England national football team

2014 FIFA World Cup qualification

International friendlies

League tables

Premier League 

In a season marked with constant changes at the top of the table, Manchester City won their second Premier League title in Chilean Manuel Pellegrini's first season in charge. Despite being overwhelming favourites at the start of the season, they were only able to confirm top spot after a final day victory against West Ham. They also won the League Cup, marking their first domestic double in a season where they dropped points at home just twice. Liverpool took second place, but did not always look like they were going to finish in the top 4; an 11-match winning run from February to April left them in a good position to end their 24-year wait for a league title, but a home defeat to Chelsea with only three games remaining, followed by a 3–3 draw at Crystal Palace where they threw away a 3–0 lead in ten minutes, ultimately proved fatal to their title challenge. The season was nonetheless a massive improvement, as they qualified for the Champions League for the first time in five years and striker Luis Suárez was the league's top marksman with 31 goals, despite not even playing for the first five games. This was also the first Premier League season where both of the top two sides broke the 100-goal mark.

After six years managing in both Italy and Spain, José Mourinho returned to Chelsea. But unlike his first season back in 2004, their campaign ended in disappointment, despite the Blues managing a serious title challenge for the first time since 2010. While they pulled off big wins against the top teams, dropped points to relegation battlers proved to be their undoing. Arsenal took the final Champions League spot, having led the league for a large part of the season before injuries to key players and a terrible run of form in the spring starting with a 5-1 loss at Liverpool, as well as heavy away losses at Chelsea (6–0) and Everton (3–0), ultimately consigned them to their sixth fourth-place finish in eight years, though they at least ended their nine-year trophy drought by winning the FA Cup.

Roberto Martínez's first season in charge of Everton saw the blue half of Merseyside take fifth place, making a serious challenge for the final Champions League spot, but ultimately falling short. Tottenham Hotspur, despite a somewhat turbulent season that saw the departure of Gareth Bale, the sacking of André Villas-Boas a few days before Christmas, and replacement manager Tim Sherwood days after the season ended, took sixth place and the final Europa League spot.

Arguably, the biggest shock of the season was defending champions Manchester United's woeful relinquishment of their Premier League trophy. The retirement of Sir Alex Ferguson, an aging squad, no youth policy to replace those players and terrible form at home (including losses to West Bromwich Albion, Newcastle United, Sunderland and Everton, who had never won at United under former boss and current United manager David Moyes, alongside a first ever defeat in their history to Swansea City, in a third round FA Cup exit), meant they surrendered their crown as early as December. This poor form saw Moyes dismissed as manager after less than a year, and a late improvement under the caretaker management of United veteran Ryan Giggs ultimately was not enough to take sixth place. This meant that United finished seventh, their lowest finish in the Premier League era, and failed to qualify for Europe for the first time since English clubs were re-admitted to Europe in 1990. It was also the first time in the Premier League era that they did not finish in the top four.

In a surprising turn of events, Crystal Palace fared the best of the three promoted clubs, finishing 11th. Few had given them any hope of surviving after they lost nine of their first ten games under Ian Holloway, while at the time had played four Premier League seasons suffering relegation in every one. However, a huge improvement after Tony Pulis took over as manager meant that the Eagles would be playing a second consecutive season in the Premier League for the first time ever. Hull City also performed reasonably well, never being seriously threatened with relegation and managing a highest-ever finish of 16th place, along with reaching the FA Cup Final.

Sunderland became only the second club to beat the "Curse of Christmas", as they were bottom on Christmas Day (and in fact for much of the campaign), but a late rally of 13 points from their final 6 games saw them earn survival. There was some controversy over their season, as they fielded an ineligible player in four early games, yet were not deducted points as would happen in the Football League and Conference; ultimately though, Sunderland would have lost just one point from such a deduction, not enough to result in their relegation.

Cardiff City's first Premier League season resulted in a bottom-place finish and an immediate relegation back to the Championship, despite breaking the 30-point mark. Their season had begun reasonably well, but quickly imploded after promotion-winning manager Malky Mackay was controversially sacked after a fall-out with club owner Vincent Tan in regards to tactics. Ole Gunnar Solskjær was drafted in, but was unable to save the Welsh side from the drop despite some positive results. Fulham's 13-year stay in the Premier League came to a disastrous end after a season in which they employed three different managers (Martin Jol, René Meulensteen and Felix Magath) and conceded 85 goals, the most out of the bottom 3 and the second-most conceded by a team in the Premier League under the 38-game format. Norwich City occupied the third relegation spot, as an inability to score (they were outscored by Suárez), atrocious away form (winning just twice) and a disastrous end to the season that saw them pick up just 1 point from a possible 21, as well as the sacking of Chris Hughton and appointment of youth team coach Neil Adams all cost them dearly, and resulted in them returning to the Championship after three years.

League table

Championship 

After last season's play-off heartbreak, Leicester City ended their decade-long exile from the Premier League by gaining promotion as champions, topping the division on Boxing Day and never surrendering their lead. Joining them were Burnley, who many had tipped for relegation, but ultimately achieved automatic promotion in Sean Dyche's first full season in charge of the Lancashire club. The 41-goal strike partnership of exciting duo Danny Ings and Sam Vokes was enough to return the Clarets to the top-flight after four years. Queens Park Rangers had to settle for the play-offs after topping the table for much of the first half of the season, scraping past Derby County in the final at Wembley to make an instant return to the Premier League.

The other two newly relegated sides, Wigan and Reading, also did well. The Latics overcame the sacking of Owen Coyle, with his replacement Uwe Rosler guiding them to the play-off places, going unbeaten in 16 of his first 18 league matches along the way, but they couldn't finish higher than 5th and they lost to QPR in the playoff semifinals in extra time. Reading missed the playoffs by a single point after Brighton grabbed a late winner against Nottingham Forest, but the Royals were in contention for promotion for virtually the whole season, with inconsistent form preventing them from finishing higher.

In only their fourth ever campaign in the second tier, Bournemouth finished an impressive 10th, despite not being in contention for either promotion or relegation for most of the season. Blackpool had gotten to a hot start, winning 5 of their first 6 and standing fourth at the end of November, but lost 10 out of their next 12 over the next two months, costing Paul Ince his job and leading to the Tangerines to a 17-match winless run which sunk them to the relegation battle, alongside scoring the fewest goals in the division, but 3 wins under caretaker manager Barry Ferguson meant they stayed up.

Yeovil Town finished bottom, struggling all season long and failing to make a serious impression in their first-ever campaign at this level. Barnsley were unable to repeat the escape from relegation they managed the previous year and went down in second-bottom place, with not even the return of the club's most successful manager, Danny Wilson, saving them. Doncaster Rovers were relegated on the final day in dramatic fashion. Going into the last game of the season a point above the relegation zone, they knew they only had to match the result of relegation rivals Birmingham City. As it transpired, they lost to Leicester, whilst Birmingham staged a miraculous comeback to draw at Bolton (having been two goals down with 14 minutes remaining), equalizing in the final few seconds of the game to send Doncaster back to League One after just a year.

League table

League One 

After two successive relegations, Wolverhampton Wanderers turned their fortunes around under Kenny Jackett and made an immediate return to the Championship, while also setting a new record of 103 points for the third tier. Brentford shrugged off the loss of Wigan-bound Uwe Rosler and took the runners-up spot as replacement boss Mark Warburton enjoyed a highly successful first season as manager, taking the Bees to the second tier for the first time in 21 years. Rotherham United were victorious in the play-offs, repeating their early 2000s feat of earning consecutive promotions from the fourth and third tiers. But one of the biggest shocks of the season was Leyton Orient, who won their first eight games of the season and seemed unstoppable, cementing themselves firmly in the automatic promotion spots before several bursts of indifferent form pushed them down to third; they would reach Wembley for the play-off final before losing to Rotherham on penalties.

But arguably, perhaps the biggest surprise of the whole English season was Sheffield United; in the relegation zone by September, they sacked manager David Weir and replaced him with Nigel Clough. At first, it appeared the appointment was in vain as they stood in the relegation zone by the end of the year; however, starting with a staggering FA Cup win over Premier League side Aston Villa in the third round, they went on a major unbeaten run in both league and cup as Nigel employed the managerial tactics of his father Brian to help the club fight their way to the top of the table. In the FA Cup, they stunned their way through each round to book their place in the semi-finals at Wembley against Hull. Whilst they lost 5–3, Clough was praised for his work in both of the club's remaining competitions. The Blades finished in seventh place, just missing out on the playoffs, but a far cry from the relegation zone they were in at the end of the year.

Stevenage, whose fortunes had rapidly declined since their play-off appearance two years prior, were relegated in bottom place. Shrewsbury finished second-bottom, only staying ahead of Stevenage on goal difference. Carlisle United finished in third-bottom place, staying clear of the relegation zone for much of the season, but ultimately going down after a terrible end to the season saw them win just 1 of their last 15 matches. Tranmere Rovers, whose season rapidly fell apart after manager Ronnie Moore was suspended (and later sacked) for betting-related offences in February, occupied the final relegation spot and fell into the fourth tier for the first time since 1989. Crewe were in the relegation zone for nearly the whole season, before a good late run of form pushed them up to 19th, albeit with the most goals conceded in the league and second-worst across all 4 divisions of League football.

League table

League Two 

Chesterfield won the League Two title for the second time in three years. Scunthorpe earned an immediate promotion as runners-up; after an uninspiring start under previous manager Brian Laws, the appointment of long-serving coach Russ Wilcox as manager saw them only lose one more match (by which time they had already been promoted) for the rest of the season. Rochdale took the final automatic promotion spot, as Keith Hill quickly brought success in his second spell as manager, earning his second promotion with the club, and only the club's third-ever promotion overall. Fleetwood Town lost out in the race for automatic promotion, but made up for this by winning the play-offs, entering League One for the first time ever.

Portsmouth's 13th-placed finish in the fourth tier was the lowest in their history, but it could've been a lot worse as they spent most of the season fighting relegation. An end-of-season run of five wins out of seven boosted them up the table, following the resignation of Richie Barker and appointment of Andy Awford.

Torquay United suffered their second relegation from the Football League, with not even a late revival in form sparing them from another bottom-place finish. Bristol Rovers, who had been continuous members of the Football League since 1920 (and ironically, the last side to finish second-bottom of the League without being relegated) went down on the last day; they had never once been in the relegation zone prior to that day and looked the safest of the three sides in danger, but wins for rivals Northampton Town and Wycombe Wanderers condemned Rovers to the Football Conference for the first time ever.

League table

Football Conference (Top Division) 

Luton Town comfortably won the Conference National's automatic promotion spot, ending their five-year exile from the Football League. Cambridge United fell short after battling with Luton for the title during the majority of the season, but ultimately won promotion through the play-offs, returning to the League after nine years in the Conference.

At the bottom of the table, Hyde were relegated after a truly awful season in which they won just one game and recorded the Conference National's lowest-ever points total. Tamworth were relegated back to the Conference North after five years. Initially, Dartford and Chester were relegated after two seasons and one season respectively in the Conference Premier. However, both clubs were reprieved from relegation as a result of Hereford United and Salisbury City being expelled from the Football Conference due to financial problems. This would be the final season completed by both clubs, as Salisbury went into liquidation before they were accepted into another league, while Hereford also went into liquidation halfway through the following season in the Southern League.

League table

League Cup

FA Cup

Women's football

Women's Super League

Women's Premier League

Northern Division

Southern Division

Managerial changes

Transfers
List of English football transfers summer 2013

Diary of the season

 2 August: Coventry City are deducted ten points for exiting administration without a Company Voluntary Agreement. Later that day, Sheffield United beat Notts County 2–1 in the first match of the season.
 5 August: The first League Cup match of the season sees League One side Preston North End defeat Championship opponents (and local rivals) Blackpool 1–0. However, there was a pitch invasion during which a steward was severely injured after accidentally being trampled by a police horse.
 9 August: Hull City A.F.C. chairman Assem Allam announced plans to change the club name to Hull City Tigers for domestic football and Hull Tigers internationally.
 11 August: The 2013 FA Community Shield features both competing teams, Manchester United and Wigan Athletic, having new managers (David Moyes and Owen Coyle respectively) taking charge of their teams for the first time in a competitive fixture. Manchester United are ultimately victorious thanks to two goals from Robin van Persie.
 17 August: The first Premier League fixture of the season sees Liverpool defeat Stoke City 1–0. Later that day Aston Villa defeat Arsenal 3–1, before Manchester United top the table after beating Swansea City 4–1 in the day's final fixture, and David Moyes's first Premier League game as United manager.
 18 August: José Mourinho makes a winning return as Chelsea manager as his side defeat Hull City 2–0 in what, coincidentally, is a repeat of the sides' first fixture in Hull's last Premier League campaign in 2009–10.
 31 August: August ends with Chelsea looking to repeat their success during Mourinho's first spell in charge, as they lead the Premiership table. Manchester City are second on goal difference, but have played one game more than Liverpool and Tottenham, both of whom play their matches for this matchweek on 1 September. Stoke City, Manchester United (with a game in hand) and West Ham United complete the top seven, while pointless Swansea City are joined in the relegation zone by Sunderland and West Bromwich Albion. In the Championship, Blackpool and QPR hold the top two spots at the end of August, while Burnley, Nottingham Forest, Leicester City and AFC Bournemouth stand in the play-off places. Bolton Wanderers prop up the table, along with Millwall and Yeovil Town.
 1 September: Tottenham and Wales winger Gareth Bale joins Real Madrid for a reported world record fee of £85 million.
 30 September: September ends with an Arsenal side leading the table, while Liverpool are leading Tottenham in second by virtue of goals scored. Everton, Chelsea, Southampton and Manchester City complete the top seven, while reigning champions Manchester United stand twelfth with only seven points from six games, their worst start in 23 years. Sunderland are bottom of the Premiership with only one point out of a possible 21 obtained, followed by Crystal Palace and Fulham. In the Championship, QPR continue to lead the division; Burnley, who sold Charlie Austin to QPR over the summer, are second. Leicester, Watford, Nottingham Forest and Reading complete the top six. At the opposite end of the table, Barnsley are now bottom but are only below Bolton and Sheffield Wednesday on goal difference.
 11 October: England defeat Montenegro 4–1 at Wembley in their penultimate 2014 World Cup qualifying match, with Tottenham winger Andros Townsend scoring on his international debut. The result means that England are now top of their qualifying group and guaranteed to at least make the play-offs (and eliminates Montenegro, barring a certain set of results in the final set of matches), but Ukraine's win the same day means that should England fail to defeat Poland in four days time, they will would enter the play-offs if Ukraine defeat San Marino.
 15 October: England secure automatic qualification for the World Cup, beating Poland 2–0 at Wembley.
 31 October: Arsenal remain top of the Premiership as October closes with Chelsea, Liverpool and Tottenham in second, third and fourth respectively. Everton and Southampton are in fifth and sixth respectively, while the two Manchester clubs, City and United, stand in seventh and eighth respectively. Sunderland have moved off the bottom of the Premiership table at the expense of managerless Crystal Palace but remain in the relegation zone, joined by Norwich City. Burnley lead the Championship, followed by Leicester City. QPR, Blackpool, Reading and Nottingham Forest stand in the play-off places. Sheffield Wednesday, the only team in the Football League without a league win this season, are bottom of the Championship and are joined in the relegation zone by Yeovil (22nd) and Barnsley (23rd).
 1 November: Tranmere Rovers midfielder Joe Thompson is diagnosed with nodular sclerosing Hodgkin's Lymphoma, a rare form of cancer.
 2 November: Manchester City record their biggest ever Premier League victory after beating Norwich 7–0 with the goals scored by seven different scorers.
 5 November: Manchester City qualify for the knock-out rounds of the Champions League for the first time, after a 5–2 victory over CSKA Moscow.
 28 November: The arrests of six men involved in an alleged football betting syndicate is revealed in the 2013 English match fixing scandal.
 30 November: At the end of November, Premier League leaders Arsenal have opened up a seven-point gap between them and joint-second Liverpool, Chelsea and Everton, thanks in part to Liverpool and Chelsea's next fixtures falling on the first of December. Newcastle United stand in fifth, ahead of Manchester City and Southampton. Crystal Palace and Sunderland remain the bottom two clubs and are joined in the drop zone by Fulham. In the Championship, Leicester hold a three-point lead over Burnley, while the play-off and relegation spots remain unchanged from the end of November, although Barnsley have now dropped below Sheffield Wednesday to the foot of the table on goal difference.
 29 December: As 2013 closes second-placed Manchester City have whittled Arsenal's lead at the top of the Premier League to one point; Chelsea are themselves one point behind City. Everton are in fourth, ahead of Merseyside rivals Liverpool. Manchester United are in sixth, ahead of a Tottenham Hotspur side with new manager Tim Sherwood. Sunderland remain bottom, while Crystal Palace have climbed clear of the relegation zone at the expense of West Ham, who are sandwiched by Fulham. Leicester City remain top of the Championship, four points ahead of Derby County and Burnley. At the other end of the table, Millwall and Doncaster Rovers are ahead of Sheffield Wednesday, who have climbed to 22nd with a game in hand and a superior goal difference over their nearest rivals. Yeovil and Barnsley are below them.
 31 January: January ends with Manchester City at the top of the league, leading Arsenal by a point. Chelsea remain in third, while Liverpool have climbed back into the top four, followed by Everton, Tottenham Hotspur and Manchester United. Sunderland have moved out of the relegation zone and are replaced at the foot of the table by Cardiff City. Leicester remain leaders of the Championship, eight points clear of QPR and eleven of Burnley, although both have a game in hand. Derby County sit in the play-off zone, with Nottingham Forest and Reading in 5th and 6th. Charlton Athletic, Barnsley and Yeovil Town make up the relegation zone.
 31 January: The protracted takeover of Leeds United is announced as completed by current owners GFH Capital. Prospective new owner Massimo Cellino promptly sacks club manager Brian McDermott. However, before the day is out, reports surface that not only is Cellino not officially the owner, but also that he has no right to sack McDermott, who is then reinstated as manager. The following day Leeds United, without a win in 5 games, and without manager Brian McDermott at the ground, after he was advised by the LMA not to attend, destroy local rivals Huddersfield Town 5–1, amidst mass protests from the fans over the handling of the takeover.
 28 February: Chelsea stand top of the Premier League at the end of February, a point ahead of second-placed Arsenal. Manchester City are third with a game in hand and Liverpool are fourth and looking to return to the Champions League after an absence of four seasons as they stand six points ahead of fifth-placed Tottenham Hotspur. Manchester United and Everton are even further behind and their seasons appear to be a challenge to qualify for the Europa League. Sunderland have moved back into the relegation zone, but with a game in hand over West Brom. Cardiff have climbed off the bottom at the expense of Fulham. Leicester have maintained their eight-point lead in the Championship, only now it is ahead of Burnley; QPR have endured a poor run of form and have fallen five points behind fourth-placed Derby. The rest of the top six and the entire bottom three is unchanged from the end of January.
 2 March: Manchester City defeat Sunderland 3–1 in the League Cup final, winning the first major trophy of the season, and the club's first trophy since Manuel Pellegrini took over as manager.
 22 March: Arsene Wenger's 1000th match in charge of Arsenal is marred not only by a 6–0 thrashing at the hands of league leaders Chelsea, but by a bizarre incident in which Kieran Gibbs is mistakenly sent off for a handball committed by Alex Oxlade-Chamberlain.
 31 March: Liverpool have retaken the lead at the top of the Premier League, following slip-ups by their rivals. Chelsea are two points behind in second place. Manchester City are four points behind Liverpool, with two games in hand, but are yet to play Liverpool at Anfield in what many pundits are already predicting will be the title decider. Arsenal have slipped down to fourth place after a terrible month, and are now in danger of being overtaken by fifth-place Everton, who are four points behind with a game in hand. Tottenham Hotspur occupy sixth place, which is now guaranteed to be the final European spot available through the league, with Manchester United two points behind them. Fulham remain bottom, and Cardiff have overtaken Sunderland; the Mackems have two games in hand over the Welsh side, but are four points adrift of West Bromwich Albion with only one game in hand. In the Championship, Leicester City and Burnley have broken clear of the chasing pack, with Leicester being six points ahead of Burnley, who in turn are nine points clear of QPR. Derby and Reading continue to occupy the play-off spots, and are now joined by Wigan Athletic, who have overtaken Nottingham Forest. At the other end, Yeovil Town and Barnsley are still stuck in the relegation places, now joined by Millwall, while fourth-bottom Charlton have several games in hand on the bottom three, who could potentially be cut adrift.
 5 April: Leicester City become the first club in the Football League to earn promotion this season, as a result of their victory the previous day combined with defeats for promotion rivals QPR and Derby County. The Foxes return to the Premier League after a 10-year absence, during which time they also spent a season in the third tier. England's hopes in the World Cup are dealt a blow when Southampton striker Jay Rodriguez is stretchered off with a ruptured cruciate ligament during his side's 4–1 defeat at Manchester City.
6 April: Liverpool return to the top of the Premier League with a hard-fought 2–1 victory over West Ham, whilst Everton, whose manager Roberto Martinez promised to deliver Champions League football to Goodison Park, sees his side destroy Arsenal 3–0 with a ruthless display of attacking football. Arsenal still occupy the last Champions League spot, but the gap is now down to a single point, and Everton still have a game in hand.
7 April: Amidst stories he is to be replaced as manager at the end if the season, Tim Sherwood leads Spurs to a 5–1 victory over Sunderland, leaving the visitors adrift at the bottom of the table, but restoring Spurs to 6th place above Manchester United, in the race for a Europa League place.
12 April: Championship side Wigan Athletic take Arsenal all the way to penalties at Wembley in the first FA Cup semi final. Wigan had taken the lead early in the second half only to see Arsenal grab a late equaliser. After a goalless extra time, Wigan missed their first two penalties, and Arsenal went through.
13 April: League One side Sheffield United push Premier League Hull City all the way, leading twice in the second FA Cup semi, before finally succumbing 5–3. Hull will play Arsenal in the FA Cup Final.
16 April: Sunderland get a valuable point away from home in a 2–2 draw against title chasing Manchester City, a result which could both help them stay up, and prevent their opponents winning the league. On the same day, Crystal Palace secure their Premier League status with a shock 3–2 win away against Champions League chasing Everton, guaranteeing their highest league finish since 1992. The result leaves Everton in 5th, just a point behind Arsenal.
18 April: Young West Ham United striker Dylan Tombides loses his fight against testicular cancer. The club, as a mark of respect, retire his no. 38 shirt.
Brentford become the second Football League club to confirm a promotion after a win over divisional rivals Preston, coupled with defeats for Leyton Orient and Rotherham sees them promoted to the Championship.
19 April: On a busy Easter weekend of fixtures, Sunderland, just three days after drawing against Manchester City, pull off one of the biggest shocks of the season, condemning José Mourinho to his first ever Premier League defeat at Stamford Bridge as they beat Chelsea 2–1. The result sees Liverpool maintain their lead at the top of the table, with a game in hand as well. To make matters worse for Chelsea, the winning goal is scored by Liverpool's on-loan striker Fabio Borini.
20 April: Liverpool extend their lead over Chelsea at the top of the Premier league to five points, after winning 3–2 at Carrow Road against a relegation threatened Norwich City, in a game which sees Luis Suárez score his 30th Premier League goal of the season – the first player to do this in 14 years. This moves Liverpool closer to their first league title since 1990. In a preview of the FA Cup final, Arsenal win 3–0 at Hull, in a game which sees them maintain their grip on 4th place and a Champions League qualification spot. David Moyes has an unhappy return to Goodison Park, as Everton complete a league double over Manchester United for the first time in 44 years with a 2–0 victory. The result sees Everton keep up the pressure on 4th placed Arsenal in the race for a Champions League spot, with the gap just a single point. Manchester United's hopes of European football take a blow, as defeat leaves them 6 points off Spurs, who occupy the last European place.
22 April: David Moyes is sacked as Manchester United manager, two days after a 2–0 defeat to his previous club, Everton. United are now seventh in the league and have no chance of a Champions League place after qualifying for 18 years in succession, and are also in danger of missing out on European qualification for the first time in 25 years. United veteran Ryan Giggs is appointed caretaker manager for the final four games, with the aim of at least beating Spurs to the final Europa League spot.
27 April: Luis Suárez is named the 2014 PFA Players' Player of the Year.
3 May: Sunderland's victory over Manchester United relegates Fulham and Cardiff – who both experienced three-goal defeats by Stoke and Newcastle respectively – and also leaves Norwich City in serious danger of relegation, as they are three points behind Sunderland with a vastly inferior goal difference. United's defeat also means that unless they take maximum points from their remaining two fixtures and Spurs lose their final match, they will not even qualify for the Europa League this year. In the Football League's final day of action, most of the promotion and play-off spots have already been decided, but the last play-off spot in the Championship and the last relegation spot in all three divisions remain to be decided. Ultimately, Brighton take the Championship's final play-off spot, while Doncaster are relegated following a late equalizer for Birmingham in their match, Tranmere are relegated from League One after losing to Bradford City (along with Carlisle United, who were technically not relegated until today, but would have needed an infeasibly large win against league leaders Wolves to stay up), while Bristol Rovers, who had never been in the relegation zone at any point in the season prior to this day, are relegated to the Football Conference after a loss to Mansfield combined with wins for relegation rivals Northampton and Wycombe.
11 May: Manchester City seal the Premier League title with a 2–0 victory over West Ham. They managed to score 102 goals over the season, second only to Chelsea's 103 in 2009–2010. They won it deservedly, without the drama of 2012, but with the same satisfaction and euphoria. Liverpool's title challenge finally succumbed, although they defeated Newcastle, coming from behind to finish second. Tottenham take the consolation Europa League place, which means that Manchester United begin next season without European football, for the first time in the Premier League era. Norwich's relegation is confirmed with a 2–0 loss against Arsenal.
17 May: Arsenal win the FA Cup for the 11th time, matching Manchester United's record, with a 3–2 win over first time finalists Hull City in extra time after the Yorkshire club took a 2–0 lead in the opening 10 minutes of its first ever major final. It is Arsenal's first major trophy for nine years and their eighth in 18 years under the management of Arsène Wenger.
19 May: Louis van Gaal is confirmed as manager of Manchester United on a three-year contract, making him the first foreign manager of the club. Former interim manager Ryan Giggs is named as his assistant, and confirms his retirement as a player at the age of 40 after nearly a quarter of a century during which he played 963 games and won an English record of 22 major trophies.

Deaths

 10 June 2013: Don Roby, 79, former Notts County F.C. and Derby County right half.
 17 June 2013: Geoff Strong, 75, former Arsenal, Liverpool and Coventry City defender.
 4 July 2013: Jack Crompton, 91, former Manchester United goalkeeper, who also managed Bury.
 8 July 2013: Dave Hickson, 83, former Everton, Aston Villa, Huddersfield Town, Liverpool, Bury and Tranmere Rovers forward, known as one of few players to represent all three major Merseyside clubs.
 14 July 2013: George Smith, 92, former Manchester City and Chesterfield inside forward.
 19 July 2013: Bert Trautmann, 89, former Manchester City goalkeeper, who famously played on in the 1956 FA Cup Final despite suffering a broken neck.
 19 July 2013: Phil Woosnam, 80, former Wales, Manchester City, Leyton Orient, West Ham United and Aston Villa striker, who also managed the USA.
 29 July 2013: Christian Benítez, 27, former Ecuador and Birmingham City striker.
 August 2013: Wilf Carter, 79, former West Bromwich Albion, Plymouth Argyle and Exeter City forward.
 5 August 2013: Malcolm Barrass, 88, former England, Bolton Wanderers and Sheffield United defender.
 6 August 2013: Steve Aizlewood, 60, former Newport County, Swindon Town and Portsmouth defender.
 6 August 2013: Dave Wagstaffe, 70, former Manchester City, Wolverhampton Wanderers, Blackburn Rovers and Blackpool winger.
 7 August 2013: Keith Skillen, 65, former Workington and Hartlepool United striker.
 13 August 2013: Johnny Hamilton, 78, former Watford midfielder.
 16 August 2013: John Ryden, 82, former Accrington Stanley, Tottenham Hotspur and Watford centre half.
 24 August 2013: Gerry Baker, 75, former USA, Manchester City, Ipswich Town and Coventry City forward.
 28 August 2013: Barry Stobart, 75, former Wolverhampton Wanderers, Manchester City, Aston Villa and Shrewsbury Town forward.
 August 2013: Brian Smith, 57, former Bolton Wanderers, Blackpool, AFC Bournemouth and Bury midfielder.
 10 September 2013: Barry Hancock, 74, former Port Vale and Crewe Alexandra inside-forward.
 15 September 2013: Peter Morley, 84, former Crystal Palace chairman.
 25 September 2013: Ron Fenton, 73, former Burnley, Birmingham City, West Bromwich Albion, Brentford and Notts County inside forward, who also managed Notts County and coached at Nottingham Forest.
 26 September 2013: Don Donovan, 83, former Republic of Ireland, Everton and Grimsby Town right back.
 1 October 2013: Peter Broadbent, 80, former England, Brentford, Wolverhampton Wanderers, Shrewsbury Town, Aston Villa and Stockport County midfielder.
 3 October 2013: Ernie Morgan, 86, former Lincoln City and Gillingham striker.
 3 October 2013: Laurie Cunningham, 91, former Barnsley and AFC Bournemouth defender.
 7 October 2013: Mick Buckley, 59, former Everton, Sunderland, Hartlepool United, Carlisle United and Middlesbrough midfielder.
 October 2013: Harold Rudman, 88, former Burnley and Rochdale full back.
 9 October 2013: Tony Alexander, 78, former Reading forward.
 19 October 2013: Geoff Smith, 85, former Bradford City goalkeeper.
 30 October 2013: Ray Mielczarek, 67, former Wales, Wrexham, Huddersfield Town and Rotherham United defender.
 4 November 2013: Roger Barton, 67, former Lincoln City and Barnsley winger.
 4 November 2013: Elfed Morris, 71, former Wrexham, Chester City and Halifax Town winger.
 5 November 2013: Stuart Williams, 83, former Wales, Wrexham, West Bromwich Albion and Southampton full back.
 6 November 2013: Sammy Taylor, 80, former Preston North End, Carlisle United and Southport winger.
 7 November 2013: Ron Dellow, 99, former Mansfield Town, Manchester City, Tranmere Rovers and Carlisle United winger.
 25 November 2013: Bill Foulkes, 81, former Manchester United captain, who survived the 1958 Munich Air Disaster.
 12 December 2013: David Jones, 73, former Crewe Alexandra, Birmingham City and Millwall inside forward.
 24 December 2013: Ron Noades, 76, former Crystal Palace chairman, who also had a spell in charge of Brentford.
 25 December 2013: Wayne Harrison, 46, former Oldham Athletic striker
 26 December 2013: Andy Malcolm, 80, former West Ham United, Chelsea and Queens Park Rangers midfielder. 
 29 December 2013: Paul Comstive, 52, former Blackburn Rovers, Wigan Athletic, Wrexham, Burnley, Bolton Wanderers and Chester City midfielder.
 3 January 2014: Eric Barnes, 76, former Crewe Alexandra centre-half.
 6 January 2014: Jim Appleby, 79, former Burnley, Blackburn Rovers, Southport and Chester defender.
 7 January 2014: Roy Warhurst, 87, former Sheffield United, Birmingham City, Manchester City, Crewe Alexandra and Oldham Athletic wing half.
 10 January 2014: Ian Redford, 53, former Ipswich Town midfielder.
 13 January 2014: Bobby Collins, 82, former Scotland, Everton, Leeds United, Bury and Oldham Athletic midfielder, who also managed at Huddersfield Town, Hull City and Barnsley.
 14 January 2014: Alan Blackburn, 78, former West Ham United and Halifax Town forward.
 18 January 2014: Andy Graver, 86, former Newcastle United, Lincoln City, Leicester City and Stoke City forward. 
 19 January 2014: Bert Williams, 93, former England, Walsall and Wolverhampton Wanderers goalkeeper.
 22 January 2014: Arthur Bellamy, 71, former Burnley and Chesterfield inside forward.
 27 January 2014: Brian Gibbs, 77, former AFC Bournemouth, Gillingham and Colchester United inside left.
 1 February 2014: Tony Hateley, 72, former Notts County, Aston Villa, Chelsea, Liverpool, Coventry City, Birmingham City and Oldham Athletic striker.
 2 February 2014: Nigel Walker, 54, former Newcastle United, Crewe Alexandra, Sunderland, Chester City and Hartlepool United midfielder.
 6 February 2014: Tommy Dixon, 84, former West Ham United, Reading, Brighton & Hove Albion, Workington and Barrow forward.
 10 February 2014: Gordon Harris, 73, former England, Burnley and Sunderland midfielder.
 12 February 2014: John Poppitt, 91, former Chesterfield, Derby County and Queens Park Rangers right back.
 14 February 2014: Sir Tom Finney, 91, former England and Preston North End winger.
 18 February 2014: Arthur Rowley, 80, former Liverpool, Wrexham and Crewe Alexandra forward.
 26 February 2014: Gordon Nutt, 81, former Coventry City, Cardiff City, Arsenal and Southend United winger.
 3 March 2014: Stan Rickaby, 89, former England, Middlesbrough and West Bromwich Albion right back.
 7 March 2014: Bob Charles, 72, former Southampton goalkeeper.
 9 March 2014: John Christie, 84, former Southampton and Walsall goalkeeper.
 10 March 2014: Vince Radcliffe, 68, former Portsmouth, Peterborough United and Rochdale defender.
 11 March 2014: Wilf Dixon, 94, former Aldershot wing half, who is best known for coaching spells with Southend United, West Bromwich Albion, Blackpool, Everton and Hull City
 12 March 2014: Calvin Palmer, 73, former Nottingham Forest, Stoke City, Sunderland and Crewe Alexandra midfielder.
 14 March 2014: Alec Gaskell, 81, former Southport, Newcastle United, Mansfield Town and Tranmere Rovers striker.
 March 2014: Dennis Jackson, 82, former Aston Villa and Millwall full back.
 22 March 2014: Ken Plant, 88, former Bury and Colchester United centre forward. 
 24 March 2014: Bryan Orritt, 77, former Birmingham City and Middlesbrough inside forward.
 30 March 2014: Fred Stansfield, 96, former Wales, Cardiff City and Newport County defender.
 5 April 2014: Gordon Smith, 59, former Aston Villa, Tottenham Hotspur and Wolverhampton Wanderers full back.
 5 April 2014: Andy Davidson, 81, former Hull City right back.
 8 April 2014: Sandy Brown, 75, former Everton, Shrewsbury Town and Southport left back.
 April 2014: Dave Blakey, 84, former Chesterfield centre-half.
 11 April 2014: Rolando Ugolini, 89, former Middlesbrough and Wrexham goalkeeper.
 14 April 2014: Peter Ellson, 88, former Crewe Alexandra goalkeeper.
 16 April 2014: Frank Kopel, 65, former Manchester United and Blackburn Rovers left back.
 18 April 2014: Dylan Tombides, 20, former West Ham United striker.
 1 May 2014: Clive Clark, 73, former Queens Park Rangers, West Bromwich Albion, Preston North End and Southport winger.
 May 2014: Terry Farmer, 82, former Rotherham United, York City and Scarborough striker.
 9 May 2014: Len Mahoney, 92, former English Football Referee.
 15 May 2014: Geoff Richards, 85, former West Bromwich Albion F.C. winger.
 28 May 2014: Stan Crowther, 78, former Aston Villa, Manchester United, Chelsea and Brighton & Hove Albion wing half
 May 2014: Terry Bell, 69, former Hartlepool United, Reading and Aldershot midfielder.
 31 May 2014: Jack Casley, 88, former Torquay United and Headington United midfielder.

Retirements

 6 June 2013: Benni McCarthy, 35, former South Africa, Blackburn Rovers and West Ham United striker.
 8 June 2013: Phil Neville, 36, former Manchester United, Everton and England defender.
 11 June 2013: Mido, 30, former Egypt, Tottenham Hotspur, Middlesbrough, Wigan Athletic, West Ham United and Barnsley striker.
 21 June 2013: Neil Harris, 35, former Millwall, Nottingham Forest and Southend United striker.
 25 July 2013: Leigh Bromby, 33, former Sheffield Wednesday, Sheffield United, Watford and Leeds United defender.
 31 July 2013: Kieron Dyer, 34, former England, Ipswich Town, Newcastle United, West Ham United, Queens Park Rangers and Middlesbrough midfielder.
 8 August 2013: Louis Saha, 35, former France, Fulham, Manchester United, Everton, Tottenham Hotspur and Sunderland striker.
 12 August 2013: Doni, 33, former Brazil and Liverpool goalkeeper.
 25 August 2013: Robin Hulbert, 33, former Swindon Town, Bristol City, Port Vale and Darlington midfielder.
 26 August 2013: Deco, 35, former Portugal, Corinthians, Alverca, Salgueiros, Porto, Barcelona, Chelsea and Fluminense midfielder.
 4 September 2013: Thomas Hitzlsperger, 31, former Germany, Aston Villa, West Ham United and Everton midfielder.
 27 September 2013: Grétar Steinsson, 31, former Iceland and Bolton Wanderers defender.
 2 October 2013: Michael Duberry, 37, former Chelsea, Leeds United, Stoke City, Reading, Wycombe Wanderers and Oxford United defender.
 11 October 2013: Rob Edwards, 30, former Wales, Aston Villa, Wolverhampton Wanderers, Blackpool and Barnsley defender. 
 16 October 2013: Rob Hulse, 33, former Crewe Alexandra, West Bromwich Albion, Leeds United, Sheffield United, Derby County and Queens Park Rangers forward.
 16 October 2013: Garry Richards, 27, former Colchester United, Southend United and Gillingham defender.
 25 October 2013: Adam Virgo, 30, former Brighton & Hove Albion, Yeovil Town and Bristol Rovers defender.
 3 December 2013: David Healy, 34, former Northern Ireland, Manchester United, Preston North End, Leeds United, Fulham, Sunderland and Bury forward.
 5 December 2013: Richard Cresswell, 36, former York City, Sheffield Wednesday, Leicester City, Preston North End, Leeds United, Stoke City and Sheffield United forward.
 16 December 2013: Rory Delap, 37, former Republic of Ireland, Carlisle United, Derby County, Southampton. Sunderland, Stoke City and Burton Albion midfielder.
 23 December 2013: Mark Creighton, 32, former Oxford United, Wrexham, defender.
 31 December 2013: Jeff Smith, 33, former Hartlepool United, Bolton Wanderers, Port Vale, Carlisle United and Darlington midfielder.
 8 January 2014: Danny Higginbotham, 35, former Gibraltar, Manchester United, Derby County, Southampton, Sunderland, Stoke City and Sheffield United defender
 14 January 2014: Luis García, 35, former Spain and Liverpool winger.
 18 January 2014: Brett Emerton, 34, former Australia and Blackburn Rovers midfielder.
 5 February 2014: Mile Sterjovski, 34, former Australia and Derby County midfielder.
 3 March 2014: David Murphy, 30, former Middlesbrough and Birmingham City left back.
 20 March 2014: Jason Roberts, 36, former Grenada, Wolverhampton Wanderers, Bristol Rovers, West Bromwich Albion, Wigan Athletic, Blackburn Rovers and Reading forward.
 8 April 2014: Michael Bridges, 35, former Sunderland, Leeds United, Bristol City, Carlisle United, Hull City and Milton Keynes Dons striker.
 30 April 2014: Phil Picken, 28, former Chesterfield and Bury defender.
 May 2014: Harry Kewell, 35, former Australia, Leeds United and Liverpool midfielder.
 May 2014: Jacob Burns, 35, former Australia, Leeds United and Barnsley midfielder.
 3 May 2014: Kevin Phillips, 40, former England, Watford, Sunderland, Southampton, Aston Villa, West Bromwich Albion, Birmingham City, Blackpool, Crystal Palace and Leicester City striker.
 3 May 2014: Chris Shuker, 31, former Manchester City, Barnsley, Tranmere Rovers, Morecambe, and Port Vale midfielder.
 6 May 2014: Richard Hughes, 34, former Scotland, AFC Bournemouth and Portsmouth midfielder.
 6 May 2014: Wayne Bridge, 33, former England, Southampton, Chelsea, Manchester City and Reading left back.
14 May 2014: Park Ji-sung, 33, former South Korea, Manchester United, and Queens Park Rangers midfielder.
 19 May 2014: Ryan Giggs, 40, former Wales and Manchester United winger; record appearance holder for his club and won 22 major trophies as a player, more than any other footballer in the history of English football.
 19 May 2014: Stephen Purches, 34, former AFC Bournemouth and Leyton Orient defender.
 22 May 2014: Craig Bellamy, 34, former Wales, Norwich City, Coventry City, Newcastle United, Blackburn Rovers, Liverpool, West Ham United, Manchester City and Cardiff City forward.

References